Tomáš Kapusta (born 23 February 1967) is a Czech ice hockey player. Kapusta was drafted 104th overall by the Edmonton Oilers in the 1985 NHL Entry Draft and spent three seasons in their organization playing for the Cape Breton Oilers of the American Hockey League but never played in the NHL. He also competed in the men's tournament at the 1994 Winter Olympics.

References

External links

1967 births
Living people
Ässät players
Cape Breton Oilers players
Cleveland Lumberjacks players
HC Dukla Jihlava players
HK Dukla Trenčín players
Edmonton Oilers draft picks
Espoo Blues players
HPK players
Ice hockey players at the 1994 Winter Olympics
Long Beach Ice Dogs (WCHL) players
Lukko players
Muskegon Fury players
Olympic ice hockey players of the Czech Republic
Sportspeople from Zlín
VHK Vsetín players
PSG Berani Zlín players
Czech ice hockey left wingers
Czechoslovak ice hockey left wingers
Expatriate ice hockey players in Canada
Czechoslovak expatriate sportspeople in Canada
Czech expatriate ice hockey players in Finland
Czechoslovak expatriate ice hockey people
Czech expatriate ice hockey players in the United States
Czech ice hockey coaches